The 2000 Atlantic 10 Conference Baseball Championship was held at Bear Stadium in Boyertown, Pennsylvania from May 18 through 20. It was the 13th and final tournament held in Boyertown. It featured the top two regular-season finishers of each of the conference's six-team divisions. West Division top seed Virginia Tech defeated Massachusetts in the title game to win the tournament for the third time, earning the Atlantic 10's automatic bid to the 2000 NCAA Tournament.

Seeding and format 
Each division's top teams, based on winning percentage in the 21-game regular season schedule, qualified for the field. In the four-team double-elimination format, the East Division champion played the West Division runner-up, and vice versa. In the West Division, Virginia Tech's regular season series win over George Washington gave it the top seed.

Bracket

All-Tournament Team 
The following players were named to the All-Tournament Team. Virginia Tech shortstop Addison Bowman, one of three Hokies selected, was named Most Outstanding Player.

Virginia Tech's Addison Bowman, also named in 1999, was selected for the second time.

References 

Tournament
Atlantic 10 Conference Baseball Tournament
Atlantic 10 Conference baseball tournament
Atlantic 10 Conference baseball tournament
Baseball in Pennsylvania
College sports in Pennsylvania
History of Berks County, Pennsylvania
Sports competitions in Pennsylvania
Sports in the Delaware Valley
Tourist attractions in Berks County, Pennsylvania